The Syracuse Stars was a 19th-century American baseball team, as well as the name of the minor league baseball teams which preceded it, based in Syracuse, New York. They played their home games at Newell Park. (They were unrelated to the Syracuse Stars of the American Association, who played for one year, in 1890.)

They finished second to the pennant-winning Buffalo Bisons, and following the season both teams jumped to the National League, a devastating blow for the IA, which lasted just two more seasons.

The Stars lone year in the NL, was not so successful. The team had a record of 22 wins and 48 losses, and did not finish their season, folding on September 10. They were 7th in the 8-team National League, ahead of the 19–56 Troy Trojans, who also did not complete their schedule. The club officially disbanded at the end of the season.

Mike Dorgan managed 43 of the Stars' games (with a 17–26 record). Bill Holbert managed on an interim basis for one game (a loss) and the season was closed out by Jimmy Macullar, who managed the final 26 games (5–21).

The team had a combined batting average of .227. First baseman Jack Farrell led the team with .303.

See also
1879 Syracuse Stars season

References

External links

Baseball Reference Team Index for the 1879 Stars

Defunct Major League Baseball teams
Defunct baseball teams in New York (state)
National League
Baseball teams disestablished in 1879
Baseball teams established in 1877
1877 establishments in New York (state)